Robert Armitage (22 February 1866 – 10 February 1944) was Member of Parliament for Leeds Central, England, from 1906 to 1922 and Lord Mayor of Leeds in 1904–05.

Background
Armitage was a son of William James Armitage and Emily Nicholson of Farnley, Leeds. He was the nephew of Edward Armitage and Thomas Rhodes Armitage, the uncle of Robert Selby Armitage, and second cousin once removed of Edward Leathley Armitage. He was educated at Westminster School and Trinity College, Cambridge. He earned a Bachelor of Arts in 1888. He first married in 1891, Caroline Katharine Ryder, a daughter of Dudley Henry Ryder of Westbrook-Hay, Hemel-Hempstead. They had three sons and four daughters. She died in 1933. He then married in 1936, Mrs Mary Dorothea Russell, widow of Rev. E. Bacheler Russell. He lived at Farnley Hall, Leeds.

Career
Armitage was called to the bar by the Inner Temple in 1889. He was director of several mining companies including Brodsworth Main Colliery Company, Llay Main Colllieries, Markham Main Colliery and Wagon Finance Corporation.

Politics

Armitage served as Lord Mayor of Leeds from 1904–05 and Deputy Lord Mayor from 1905–06, 1906–07 and 1908–09. He was a Justice of the peace for the City of Leeds. He gained Leeds Central from the Conservative in 1906, the first time the Liberals had won the constituency. He was comfortably re-elected in both 1910 elections. He supported the wartime Coalition government. At the 1918 election he received endorsement by the government and did not get a Unionist opponent and was easily re-elected. At the 1922 election he stood as a candidate of the official Liberal party rather than as a National Liberal supporter of Lloyd George. As a result he not only faced a Labour party opponent but a Unionist opponent and lost his seat, finishing third. He did not stand for parliament again.

Electoral record

References

External links 
 

Members of the Parliament of the United Kingdom for English constituencies
UK MPs 1906–1910
UK MPs 1910
UK MPs 1910–1918
UK MPs 1918–1922
Lord Mayors of Leeds
English businesspeople
Politicians from Leeds
1866 births
1944 deaths
Alumni of Trinity College, Cambridge
People educated at Westminster School, London
Liberal Party (UK) MPs for English constituencies